A National treasure of France is a cultural good of major importance to the heritage of France from the point of view of art, history, or archeology. It is officially designated as such when a particular good has been the subject of a refusal of an export certificate which temporarily prevents its exit from the territory of France.

Criteria
National treasures are defined in article L.111-1 of the French heritage code:

Goods belonging to the collections of museums in France
Public archives as well as goods classified as historical archives
Properties classified as historical monuments
Other goods forming part of the movable public domain (art. L. 2112-1 of the general code of the property of public persons)
Other properties of major interest for the national heritage from the point of view of history, art, or archeology.

References 

French culture